Janq'u Quta (Aymara janq'u,  white, quta lake, "white lake", also spelled Jankho Khota) is a  mountain in the Kimsa Cruz mountain range in the Andes of Bolivia. It is situated in the La Paz Department, Inquisivi Province, Quime Municipality. Janq'u Quta lies south-east of the mountain Mama Uqllu.

References 

Mountains of La Paz Department (Bolivia)